Christina Zachariadou (born 28 August 1974) is a retired Greek tennis player.

In her career, she won three singles titles and twelve doubles titles on the ITF Circuit. On 20 October 2003, she reached her best singles ranking of world No. 358. On 11 September 1995, she peaked at No. 186 in the doubles rankings.

Zachariadou competed in the women's doubles tournament of the 1992 Summer Olympics in Barcelona, 1996 Summer Olympics in Atlanta, and at the 2004 Summer Olympics in Athens.

Playing for Greece in Fed Cup, Zachariadou started in 1990 and accumulated a win–loss record of 26–27.

ITF Circuit finals

Singles: 8 (3–5)

Doubles: 27 (12–15)

References

External links
 
 
  

1974 births
Living people
Greek female tennis players
Olympic tennis players of Greece
Tennis players at the 1992 Summer Olympics
Tennis players at the 1996 Summer Olympics
Tennis players at the 2004 Summer Olympics
Sportspeople from Athens
Mediterranean Games gold medalists for Greece
Mediterranean Games medalists in tennis
Competitors at the 1997 Mediterranean Games